Monk in Tokyo is a live album recorded in 1963 and first released in Japan by Columbia Records as two separate LPs in 1963 (PSS 46 "In Tokyo 1" and PSS 47 "In Tokyo 2"), then in edited form as a single LP in 1969 by CBS/Sony Records and reissued in complete form as a double LP in 1973, featuring several original Monk compositions as well as jazz standards.

Track listing 
All tracks are written by Thelonious Monk except where noted.

Disc One:
 "Straight, No Chaser" - 9:46
 "Pannonica" - 7:46
 "Just a Gigolo" (Julius Brammer, Irving Caesar, Leonello Casucci) - 2:30
 "Evidence (Justice)" - 7:55
 "Jackie-ing" - 5:07
 "Bemsha Swing" (Denzil Best, Thelonious Monk) - 4:25
 "Epistrophy [theme]" (Kenny Clarke, Monk) - 1:10
Disc Two:
 "I'm Getting Sentimental Over You" (George Bassman, Ned Washington) - 9:28
 "Hackensack" - 11:03
 "Blue Monk" - 13:18
 "Epistrophy" (Clarke, Monk) - 8:25

Personnel 
 Thelonious Monk – piano
 Charlie Rouse - tenor saxophone
 Butch Warren – bass
 Frankie Dunlop – drums

References 

Thelonious Monk live albums
1963 live albums
Columbia Records live albums